Ásgeir Sigurgeirsson (born 2 September 1985 in Reykjavik) is an Icelandic sport shooter who competes in the men's 10 metre air pistol. At the 2012 Summer Olympics, he finished 14th in the qualifying round, failing to make the cut for the final.  He also took part in the 50 metre pistol, finishing in 32nd place.

References

External links
 

Icelandic male sport shooters
Living people
Olympic shooters of Iceland
Shooters at the 2012 Summer Olympics
1985 births
Shooters at the 2015 European Games
European Games competitors for Iceland
Shooters at the 2019 European Games
Shooters at the 2020 Summer Olympics